The UNESCO Mozart Medal is an award named after Wolfgang Amadeus Mozart and administered by UNESCO.

Recipients
 Elisabeth Schwarzkopf, 1991
 Alicia Terzian, 1995
 Elfi von Dassanowsky, 1996
 Igor Moiseyev, 2001,  for "outstanding contribution to world music culture"
 Hanna Kulenty, 2003
 Tikhon Khrennikov, 2003
 Purcell School of Music, February 6, 2003
 Mohammad-Reza Shajarian, 2006
 Mstislav Rostropovich, 2007
 Mehriban Aliyeva, 2010   
 Tamás Vásáry, 2012, for "his talent and dedication to the universal values that inspire UNESCO"

See also
 Mozart Medal (disambiguation)

References

International music awards
Wolfgang Amadeus Mozart